Filippino is a male Italian given name and the dimunitive form of Filippo. Notable people with the name include:
Filippino Doria (1470/1480–1548/1558), Italian admiral
Filippino Lippi (1457–1504), Italian painter

Italian masculine given names